The Tharros Punic inscriptions are a group of Punic inscriptions found at the archeological site of Tharros in Sardinia.

In the nineteenth century, a few funerary inscriptions engraved on cippi were discovered (CIS I 154-161). In 1901 an important 3rd century BC inscription dedicated to Melqart was found, but the surface was very damaged, currently the longest Punic inscription outside of North Africa.

Many short texts are engraved on small objects: a hemisphere in dolomitic stone, an amulet, and two silver plates.

Neopunic graffiti on ceramic fragments has also been found.

Concordande

Bibliography
 
 ICO: 
  CIS: Corpus Inscriptionum Semiticarum; the first section is focused on Phoenician-Punic inscriptions (176 "Phoenician" inscriptions and 5982 "Punic" inscriptions)

References

Punic inscriptions
Phoenician colonies in Sardinia